The Western Rage (formerly known as Granville Rage) are an Australian semi-professional soccer club, located in the Greater Western Sydney suburb of Granville. The club was founded in 2000. They currently play in the NSW League Two Men's competition, they have played in the NSW League One (formerly NSW Super League), the second tier of football in New South Wales below the NSW Premier League.

History 

The club was founded in 2000, originally located in the Greater Western Sydney suburb of Prairiewood where they were known as the Prairiewood Rage. Due to the club being in the then Southern Districts Association, there were already an abundance of junior clubs in the area, making it difficult for the Rage to develop at grass-roots level. However, a lifeline appeared through the Granville Association, who allowed them into the competition. After some negotiating with the Granville Association, the club was renamed Granville Rage and re-located to their current home at Garside Park. This meant that the district regarded as the birthplace of football in Australia had – for the first time in many years – a State League operation bearing its name.

Current senior squad

References

External links 
 Home Page
 Senior Squad List
 https://therage8.wixsite.com/granville-rage/regional-youth-league

Soccer clubs in Sydney
Association football clubs established in 2000
2000 establishments in Australia
Granville, New South Wales